Bálint Fekete (born 27 June 1995) is a Hungarian handball player for Dabas KK and the Hungarian national team.

He represented Hungary at the 2020 European Men's Handball Championship.

References

External links

BM Ciudad Encantada

Hungarian male handball players
Living people
1995 births
SC Pick Szeged players
Expatriate handball players
Hungarian expatriate sportspeople in Spain
Liga ASOBAL players
People from Gyula
Sportspeople from Békés County